Motorcycle commuting is a commuting alternative to buses, trains and cars.  The term includes a number of two wheel motor vehicles including scooters, minibikes, monkey bikes and motorcycles.

United Kingdom
In London, England, powered two-wheelers (PTWs) increased by 40% between 1997 and 2007. About 16,000 PTWs rode into London by 2007.  

Due to revenue raising objectives, Westminster Council (London) began charging motorcycles to park by 2007. Many groups stand for the motorcyclist and PTW users and they are actively lobbying Westminster Council to try to persuade them not to pursue charging for motorcycle parking.

United States
In the United States, many individuals commute by motorcycle.  Ride To Work Inc. is a national organization that encourages motorcycle commuting.  Its annual Ride To Work day, the United States' largest motorcycle event by number of participants, is designed increase awareness of motorcyclists amongst other road users.

References

Commuting
Commuting